Ranjeet Virali-Murugesan (born 30 September 1985) is an Indian tennis player.

Virali-Murugesan has a career high ATP singles ranking of 417 achieved on 24 May 2010 and a career high ATP doubles ranking of 268, achieved on 11 August 2014. Virali-Murugesan has won one ITF singles title and eighteen ITF doubles titles.

Virali-Murugesan has represented India at the Davis Cup, where he has a win–loss record of 0–2.

External links

1985 births
Living people
Indian male tennis players
People from Coimbatore
Racket sportspeople from Chennai